Nelsonville is a ghost town in Eau Claire County, Wisconsin, United States. The town was marked on USGS maps as late as 1932.

References 

Geography of Eau Claire County, Wisconsin
Ghost towns in Wisconsin